is a Japanese company that produces a line of motorsport helmets.

History 
Shoei is a Japanese company producing motorcycle helmets since 1958.
Its roots go back to 1954 with the founding of Kamata Polyester Co., whose first helmets were produced primarily for use in the construction industry.

Shoei's founder, Eitaro Kamata(鎌田栄太郎), was born to a family in Tokyo that operated a traditional Japanese restaurant, Edogin, and an inn near Shimbashi Station.  Soichiro Honda and his colleague, Kiyoshi Kawashima Kiyoshi Kawashima (the first test rider and later President of Honda Motor Co.), who were located in Hamamatsu, became regulars for the inn, Kamata Ryokan, as they needed to come to the capital often.  Eitaro got acquainted with Mr. Kawashima, who often arrived at the inn on a motorcycle, and admired Mr. Kawashima's style with a painted helmet.  He moved away from the family business and began to produce helmets, and in 1960, the Tokyo factory began to produce the first motorcycle helmets to meet the Japanese Industrial Standard (JIS).

When inquired about the origins of the name, a Shoei representative replied: "Shoei is not an actual word and does not mean anything. In Japan the passage of time is marked in dynasties which are the lifetime of an emperor. When Shoei was started in 1959 they were in the Showa dynasty so its first character (昭 -sho) was combined with the first character of the founder's first name Eitaro (栄太郎) and resulted in the brand name (昭栄 -Shoei)."

In 1965, Honda Motor Co. adopted Shoei's helmets as their 'genuine' helmets as a part of Honda Parts and Accessories line of products, increasing their popularity and availability. The Shoei Safety Helmet Corporation was established in the U.S.A. in 1968, shortly after construction of the Ibaraki factory. The current Iwate factory was built in 1989.

In 1987, Shoei Europe Distribution s.a.r.l. was established in France, followed by Shoei (Europa) Gmbh in Germany in 1994, Shoei Italia s.r.l. in Italy in 2011 and Shoei Asia Co., Ltd. in Thailand in 2019.

Despite their success, Shoei remains a relatively small company, with a workforce of under 800 people worldwide.

Helmets 
Shoei provides helmets for numerous MotoGP riders. In the MotoGP class Marc Márquez with eight Grand Prix World Championships, Álex Márquez (the younger brother of  Marc Márquez), Andrea Dovizioso and Fabio Di Giannantonio. In Moto2, Thomas Lüthi, Jake Dixon and Hafizh Syahrin. In Moto3, Yuki Kunii and Deniz Öncü.

Since the foundation of the company, all Shoei helmets have been designed and manufactured in Japan, although they are distributed and sold globally.

Shoei was one of the first helmet manufacturers to introduce lightweight carbon-fibre helmets in the mid-1970s.

Shoei's GRV helmet was the first helmet to use carbon fiber and Kevlar. Shoei also created the first coverless shield system and the Dual Liner Ventilation system.
The flagship X-Spirit was introduced in 2003 and was promoted by Shoei as the most advanced helmet in the world, winning MCN's Product of the Year 2003 award in the clothing category. It was followed by further development and the introduction of the RF-1000 (sold as the XR-1000 in Europe) in 2004, and the later introduction of the X-Eleven.  These helmets paved the way for the current RF-1200 and X-14 models. In September 2010 the QWEST was released, the successor of the RAID II, a top-of-the-line sport touring helmet.

The NXR2 helmet is the company's first to meet the (new in 2021) ECE 22-06 standard. This standard, established by the United Nations Economic Commission for Europe, is the first update of its helmet safety standards since 2005.

Financial effects of the Great East Japan earthquake 
Shoei was a victim of the earthquake that struck Japan in 2011. Two factories named Iwate and Ibaraki were damaged and had to be (partially) restored. Its costs calculated on an accrual basis were estimated at around 63 million Yen.

See also 
SHARP (helmet ratings)
Snell Memorial Foundation
Bell Sports
Arai Helmet
AGV (helmet manufacturer)
Simpson Performance Products

References

External links 

 

Motorcycle helmet manufacturers
Sporting goods manufacturers of Japan
Manufacturing companies based in Tokyo
Manufacturing companies established in 1959
Japanese companies established in 1959
Companies listed on the Tokyo Stock Exchange
Japanese brands